Gary Richardson is a former member of the Arizona State Senate. He served two terms in the Senate from January 1995 through January 1999, representing district 27.  He ran for re-election in 2000, but lost in the general election to Harry E. Mitchell.

References

Republican Party Arizona state senators
Living people
Year of birth missing (living people)